Ruben Pieter de Haas (born October 9, 1998) is a rugby union player who plays scrum-half for the United States men's national team and for  Saracens in Premiership Rugby.

Early life
De Haas attended Jessieville High School and played rugby for the Little Rock Junior Stormers, one of only two high school rugby teams in the state of Arkansas.

Professional career

Cheetahs

In May 2018, the Free State Cheetahs announced that he signed a contract with the  – the union's Pro14 team – until the end of October 2020.

Saracens
It was announced in February 2021 that de Haas would join Saracens ahead of the 2021–22 season.

International career

Youth teams
De Haas first represented the United States as a member of the United States men's national under-19 team (High School All-Americans) in their 2016 tour of Ontario, Canada. De Haas served as the captain of the High School All-Americans.

De Haas debuted with the United States men's national under-20 team (Junior All-Americans) in the 2016 World Rugby Under 20 Trophy. de Haas made his first appearance for the Junior All-Americans as a 65th minute substitute in a 46–44 loss to Namibia on April 19. De Haas made his first start at scrum-half for the Junior All-Americans in their 32–12 victory over Hong Kong on April 23.

De Haas also made two appearances for the Junior All-Americans in 2017 World Rugby Under 20 Trophy qualification matches. He scored one conversion in the Junior All-Americans' 46–12 defeat to Canada on June 13, 2017. He also scored one conversion and one penalty goal in the Junior All-American's 27–25 victory over Canada on June 17, 2017. De Haas served as the vice captain of the Junior All-Americans.

USA Selects
De Haas made his first appearance with the USA Selects on October 7, 2017, starting at scrum-half in the Selects' 48–26 defeat to Samoa in the 2017 Americas Pacific Challenge. De Haas scored his first try for the Selects on October 15, 2017, appearing as a substitute in the Selects' 45–26 victory over Canada.

USA Eagles
De Haas made his debut with the USA Eagles on February 17, 2018, appearing as a substitute in the Eagles' 45–13 victory over Chile in the 2018 Americas Rugby Championship. De Haas played 4 matches for the U.S. at the 2019 Rugby World Cup.

References

External links
 

1998 births
Living people
American rugby union players
United States international rugby union players
People from George, South Africa
South African emigrants to the United States
Rugby union scrum-halves
Free State Cheetahs players
Cheetahs (rugby union) players
Austin Gilgronis players
Saracens F.C. players